Noel Christian Tovey  (born 25 December 1934) is an Australian dancer, actor, mentor, director and choreographer. He was the artistic director for the indigenous welcoming ceremony at the Sydney 2000 Olympics.

Early life 
Born in Melbourne, the son of an Aboriginal/ New Zealand mother and father of Scottish-African descent, Tovey endured sexual abuse, neglect and poverty throughout his childhood and adolescence.

Career
Despite this hardship he went on to become successful in the theatre in both Australia and London, including appearing in the world premiere of Oh! Calcutta!.
He taught at the Bristol Old Vic Theatre School and the Royal Academy of Dramatic Art in London and co-founded the London Theatre for Children before returning to Australia in 1990.

He played the lead role in Skipping on Stars based on the life of indigenous tightwire walker Con Colleano, performed to celebrate the 25th anniversary of the Flying Fruit Fly Circus.

In 2004, Hodder Headline Australia published his autobiography Little Black Bastard .

Personal life 
Tovey is openly gay and has spoken out for the rights of LGBT elders. 
Tovey was imprisoned for homosexual acts in Pentridge gaol in 1951 and raped by two of the guards. In June 2010 Tovey was recognised for his contribution to the LGBT community by becoming the 2010 recipient of the {also} Foundation For All of Us Lifetime Achievement Award. In January 2015, Tovey was made a member of the Order of Australia. Also in 2015, Tovey was inducted to the Victorian Aboriginal Honour Roll.

Noel married Barbara Hickling and they had a daughter Felicity in 1961 (deceased).

External links
 The Australian Lesbian and Gay Archives holds a small collection of personal papers relating to Noel Tovey

References

Australian male stage actors
Australian people of New Zealand descent
Australian gay actors
LGBT dancers
LGBT choreographers
Indigenous Australian actors
Male actors from Melbourne
Choreographers from Melbourne
1934 births
Living people
Members of the Order of Australia